Bernard J. David is an entrepreneur, educator, and author.

David has founded, built and sold several businesses. They include SaveSmart, Inc. (Prio, Inc.)--sold to Infospace, Inc. and officesupplies.com—sold to Office Depot.

David has taught at the Wharton School, University of Pennsylvania as a lecturer in entrepreneurship to undergraduates, graduates and executives ,and has written eight books on various elements of entrepreneurship and allied computer technology use.  The books include The Entrepreneurial PC and Milestone Planning for Successful Ventures.

Sustainability
Since 2001, David has turned his attention to the area of sustainability. He believes that a systems approach to sustainability is critical—one that is based on science, and harnesses market forces to drive and fuel progress. To that end, he is the founder of the Global  Initiative, a market-based solution to address one of the grand challenges of our planet: the impact of excessive  emissions in our atmosphere and oceans. By investing in innovative approaches to capture and transform  into commercial products, the initiative endeavors to create economically-viable solutions that offer sustained climatological benefits. Mr. David was also a commissioner on the Energy Transitions Commission, a diverse group of global leaders from corporate, governmental, academic and non-profit backgrounds that believe the evolution of energy systems is not a single change, but is made up of many different, but inter-connected energy transitions. The group aims to inform what it will take to create credible, accelerating transitions towards universal, clean energy systems across the world.

From a science perspective, David has served on the boards of NEON, Inc. (The National Ecological Observatory Network) funded by the United States National Science Foundation, Stroud Water Research Center, and CosmosID. He is a member of the Director's Council of the Scripps Institution of Oceanography whose mission is to seek, teach, and communicate scientific understanding of the oceans, atmosphere, Earth, and other planets for the benefit of society and the environment. David sits on the Strategic Advisory Board of the Joint Center for Artificial Photosynthesis (JCAP), the nation's largest research program dedicated to the development of artificial solar fuels generation science and technology. He is a member of the advisory committee of the AAAS-Lemelson Invention Ambassadors Program, a program designed to highlight the importance of invention to economic development, innovation and quality of life, globally.

Educationally, David founded erthnxt, inc., now a part of the National Wildlife Federation, whose flagship program “Trees for Wildlife” focuses on educating youth on the merits of gaining a long-term perspective. David was a senior fellow at The Wharton School's Initiative on Global Environmental Leadership (IGEL) and a member of the External Advisory Board of the Graham Sustainability Institute at the University of Michigan.

From a policy standpoint, David served as a trustee of The H. John Heinz III Center for Science, Economics and the Environment.  He has also been an advisor to the United States Environmental Protection Agency.

In 2007, David gave a speech to the Pacific Pension Institute's Annual Conference entitled, “Climate Change and Its Influence on Investing:  A New Perspective," which outlined investment opportunities brought on by a changing climate. Its approach has been used by David when making investments or serving on the boards of sustainable businesses. As such, David is the chairman of ReProduct, Inc.; and he serves as a member of the board of directors of CMC Energy Services, Inc. He has also served on the boards of Solidia Technologies, Inc., Tangent Energy Solutions and Philadelphia Renewable Energy, Inc. David was a venture partner and advisor to EnerTech Capital.

Education
David earned a Bachelor of Arts in political science from the University of Pennsylvania, a Bachelor of Science in Finance and an MBA in marketing from the Wharton School of the University of Pennsylvania.

Personal life
Bernard is married to Lisa Day David, an artist. They have two grown children, Sam and Emily.

References

American businesspeople
1957 births
Living people